Livin' in a Crime Wave is the debut studio album by American hip hop duo Havoc & Prodeje of South Central Cartel. It was released on May 25, 1993 through G.W.K. Records and Pump Records with distribution via Quality Records. Recording sessions took place at Kitchen Sync Studios in Los Angeles. Though the old-school sounded album was met with positive reviews, it failed to find the success of South Central Cartel.

Track listing
"Crime Wave"- 5:01  
"I Mo Nigga N da Paint"- 4:40  
"We Ain't Nuttin But Locs"- 3:44  
"Everybody Wanna G-Sta"- 4:09  
"Layin Low, Pt. 1"- 4:03  
"Disturb the Peace"- 4:57  
"On a Mission"- 4:04  
"Hoes in da World"- 3:36  
"Get on or Get Peed On"- 3:41  
"Gonna Getcha"- 3:45  
"What "R" You Gonna Do"- 4:25  
"Muthafucca Say What"- 5:30  
"Cold Young Niggaz"- 7:35  
"Poot Butt Gangsta"- 3:42

References

External links

1993 albums
Havoc & Prodeje albums
South Central Cartel albums
Albums produced by Prodeje
G-funk albums
Gangsta rap albums by American artists
West Coast hip hop albums